Nile Air is an Egyptian airline based at Cairo International Airport that operates scheduled services to destinations in Egypt and the Middle East, the Persian Gulf, Southern Europe, Asia and Africa. Nile Air is the largest private airline in Egypt and second only to Egyptair. It is a full-service carrier (with business and economy class services) that operates scheduled services, using a fleet of Airbus A320-200s & Airbus A321-200s. In addition to operations from its hub at Cairo International Airport, the airline operates a smaller base from Alexandria's Borg El Arab Airport.

History
On 1 November 2009, the airline received its Air operator's certificate (AOC) from the Egyptian Civil Aviation Authority, which permitted the airline to launch operations. The airline had ordered nine Airbus A321-200 aircraft in 2007, however in 2015 this order was adjusted to two aircraft. It launched operations in August 2010, operating a short-term wet lease contract with Libyan Arab Airlines, before starting scheduled services from Egypt in March 2011, with the launch of flights to Saudi Arabia.
 
In January 2011, the airline became the first private Egyptian airline to publish its schedule and flight availability on the Global Distribution System (GDS) and is now covered on all 3 GDS systems; Amadeus, Sabre Corporation & Travelport.

In 2013, Nile Air joined the Arab Air Carriers Organization and the African Airlines Association in 2016. Also in 2016, the airline became the first airline in the Middle East to use Amadeus’ complete Airline IT portfolio, which provides end-to-end IT solutions. In June 2016, Nile Air and Lila Design worked together on the Nile Air A320 special 'Egypt Tourism' livery which was unveiled on an Airbus A320 (SU-BQM).

In 2017, the airline became the official airline of the Egypt national football team - the first deal of its kind. In addition, the airline is among the main sponsors of the team.

Corporate affairs

Ownership
Nile Air is an Egyptian Joint Stock Company established in 2008, with 60% ownership by Egyptian individuals & companies and the remaining 40% by Dr. Nasser Al Tayyar, former President of Al Tayyar Group (now called Seera  ), a prominent travel agency based in Kingdom of Saudi Arabia with operations in over 15 countries. Nile Air is shown in the accounts of the Al Tayyar Travel Holding Company as a 'related company'. 

There have been several press reports in recent years that the airline was looking to go public on the Egyptian Stock Exchange, with as much as 30% of the carrier's stock being offered to Egyptian investors, with the owner and founder Nasser Al Tayyar retaining a 40% stake.

Business trends
Nile Air is a private company, and annual reports are not published.  In the absence of these, limited information on financial trends especially, is available.  Available figures are shown below (for years ending 31 December):

Head office
The airline's head office is located opposite Cairo International Airport's Terminal 1 in Cairo, Egypt.

Destinations

As of July 2017, Nile Air serves the following destinations with scheduled services:

Fleet
, the Nile Air fleet consists of the following aircraft:

References

External links

Airlines of Egypt
Airlines established in 2009
Arab Air Carriers Organization members
Companies based in Cairo
Egyptian companies established in 2009